Education in Northern Cyprus is organized by the Ministry of National Education and Culture. 5 years of primary education is mandatory. As of 2015, Kemal Dürüst is the Minister of National Education and Culture.

Kindergarten

Children in Northern Cyprus, below age 6, can attend kindergartens of public and private institutions. Kindergarten is not mandatory.

Elementary school

Elementary school provides 5 years of education for children between the ages of 6 and 11. All elementary schools are public and free.

High school

High schools provide a minimum 6 years of education, where 3 years last for junior high school (Ortaokul). There are different kinds of high schools in Northern Cypriot education system, such as standard public high schools, private high schools, science high schools, vocational high schools, technical high schools and fine arts high schools. As of 2008, there are 18 high schools, 14 junior high schools and 12 vocational high schools.

Universities

All of universities in Northern Cyprus are private except Eastern Mediterranean University, METU-NCC, and ITU-TRNC. In 2013 there were 63,765 university students from 114 countries in nine universities in Northern Cyprus. In 2014, the number of students increased to 70,004, (15,210 Turkish Cypriots; 36,148 from Turkey; 18,646 international students).

There are 19 universities in Northern Cyprus:

Atatürk Teacher Academy and Police Academy provide vocational education in related subjects.

International membership of Northern Cyprus institutions

 Near East University’s Faculty of Pharmacy was accredited by The Accreditation Council for Pharmacy Education (ACPE) in 2014.
 The law faculties of the three universities of Northern Cyprus were accredited by European Law Faculties Association (ELFA).
 The English Preparatory School of European University of Lefke was accredited by Pearson Assured in 2015.
 Near East University and Eastern Mediterranean University are members of European University Association.
 Girne American University and Cyprus International University are members of European Council for Business Education (ECBE).

On 17-18 May 2019, The Central and Eastern European Network of Quality Assurance Agencies in Higher Education (CEENQA) held its meeting in Northern Cyprus; 26 quality assurance institutions from 20 countries participated the meeting.

References

External links
Ministry of National Education and Culture